Udaipur city in Rajasthan state has five major lakes, as listed below, which are under restoration with funds provided by the National Lake Conservation Plan (NLCP) of the Government of India.

 Fateh Sagar Lake 
Rang Sagar lake
 Pichola lake 
Swaroop Sagar lake
 Dudh Talai lake

Gallery

References 

 
U 
L
Udaipur-related lists

External links 

 Lakes in Udaipur Rajasthan